is a trilogy of beat 'em up video games released by Jaleco for the Super Famicom.  Although all three games were released outside Japan, localization resulted in various changes to the games' storylines and gameplay. While all three titles were released under the Rushing Beat name in Japan, localized versions used three distinct titles and changed storylines and character names. In the Japanese versions, the storyline mainly revolves around two heroes, Rick Norton and Douglas Bild. The original English title refers to a rushing attack and the fact that Norton (a plainclothes detective) and Bild (a uniformed officer) are police officers working a beat. According to the Japanese storyline, the game locale's name is "Neo-Cisco", a futuristic San Francisco, California.

Gameplay 
The games play like typical beat'em ups, with both jump and attack buttons. The attack button allows players to use a standing combination of attacks, as well as jumping attacks, holds and throws. Each game features a one or two player mode, in which the player must defeat a plethora of enemies using punches, kicks and various weapons collected throughout the course of the game. Like other games in the genre, a powerful special attack can also be launched, at the cost of some of the player's health. Later games in the series added additional super attacks that could be performed using various button/directional combinations. One of the main features of the series is the "Angry" (Original Japanese: "Ikari") mode where the character, after taking enough damage, becomes temporarily invincible and has more powerful throws. The games have also featured versus modes, in which up to four players (in the third game) can battle each other.

Games 
Rushing Beat is the first entry to the series. The game was released outside Japan as Rival Turf!, but Western versions omitted the game's introduction scene and changed the names of the game's protagonists from "Rick Norton" and "Douglas Bild" to "Jack Flak" and "Oozie Nelson" respectively.

The second game in the series is Rushing Beat Ran. The game retained the playable characters from the first game in the series and added several other playable characters. The game was released in Western markets as Brawl Brothers. Norton and Bild's names were again changed, this time to "Hack" and "Slash". The Japanese version is playable in Brawl Brothers through the use of a cheat code.

The third and final game in the series is Rushing Beat Shura. The game included new player characters, branching story paths, new special moves and several different endings. Rick Norton is available as a secret character while Douglas Bild only makes a hidden cameo appearance. The game was released outside Japan as The Peace Keepers, with various changes and omissions affecting the game's storyline, gameplay and soundtrack.

External links 
Exploration of the trilogy

1992 video games
City Connection franchises
Super Nintendo Entertainment System games
Jaleco beat 'em ups
Cooperative video games
Fighting games
Video game franchises
Side-scrolling beat 'em ups
Video game franchises introduced in 1992
Video games developed in Japan